Galina Konstantinovna Stakhanova (born October 12, 1940 in Moscow,  RSFSR, USSR) is a Soviet and Russian actress of theater and cinema.

Biography
Galina Stakhanova was born on October 12, 1940, in Moscow.

In 1960-1962, she was a pupil of the make-up artist at the Mayakovsky Theatre.

In 1962-1964 he was the head of the supply department in GITIS.

Since 1965   costume designer at the House of Culture of Moscow State University and administrator in groups at the Mosfilm Studio.

Since childhood, I dreamed of being an actress, but I did not dare to enter a theater university. Working in the theater, I met actress Vera Pashennaya and heard from her:  There is a lot of warmth in you. You, of course, need to play. Go to amateur performance, from there start it. 

In 1965 Galina passed the competition in the Student Theater of Moscow State University and became his actress, where she worked for a long time in parallel with the main work.

Since 1973, she worked in the procurement department of the Central Lenin Stadium.

Since 1985  senior controller of the Sports Palace Luzhniki.

Then she worked at the Theater of Roman Viktyuk. In the cinema since 1979. He is a characteristic actress, plays mostly supporting roles and episodes, although sometimes the main roles also occur.

Personal life
She lives in Moscow in the residential area of Yasenevo. There is a daughter and a granddaughter. Likes to play bowling

Selected filmography 
 The Girls (1961) as Galya
 Scenes from Family Life (1979) as employee atelier
 Kindergarten (1983) as Zhenya's grandmother 
 Long Memory (1985) as Maria Vasilyevna Shtyrenko
 Fast Train (1988) as Alla
 The Kerosene's Wife (1988)  as Grusha
 Love with Privileges (1989) as  old-timer
 The Asthenic Syndrome (1990) as doctor of the Moscow metro
 Stalin's Funeral (1990) as graveyard worker
 Demobbed  (2000) as grandmother
 Old Hags (2000) as traveling
 Night Watch (2004) as old lady
 Gloss (2007) as old weaver
 Univer (2008—2010) as Avdotya
 Yolki (2010), Yolki 2 (2011),  Yolki 3 (2013), Yolki 1914 (2014),  Yolki 5 (2016)  as Maria Ilyinichna (Baba Manya)
 Univer. New Dorm (2011) as  Anton's and  Kristina's  neighbor
 Kitchen  (2013) as sanitary at the hospital
Music video
 Garik Sukachov: Rings (2003)
 Sekret: On Either Side of the Earth (2013)
 Egor Kreed: Heartbreaker Girl (2019)

References

External links
 
  Galina Stakhanova  on KinoPoisk

1940 births
Living people
Actresses from Moscow
Soviet film actresses
Soviet stage actresses
Soviet television actresses
Russian film actresses
Russian stage actresses
Russian television actresses
20th-century Russian actresses
21st-century Russian actresses